Aghamore also known as Aughamore, is a village and parish in eastern County Mayo, Ireland.

Sport
The parish is home to Aghamore GFC (a Gaelic football club) and Tooreen Hurling Club.

References

External links
 Aghamore on Mayo-Ireland.ie

Towns and villages in County Mayo